Delanco is a station on the River Line light rail system, located on Rhawn Avenue in Delanco, New Jersey.

The station opened on March 15, 2004. Southbound service from the station is available to Camden, New Jersey. Northbound service is available to the Trenton Rail Station with connections to New Jersey Transit trains to New York City, SEPTA trains to Philadelphia, Pennsylvania, and Amtrak trains. Transfer to the PATCO Speedline is available at the Walter Rand Transportation Center.

No connecting service is available at this station. The station itself is the first one after the crossing of the Rancocas Creek Railroad Bridge. The surroundings of the station are primarily residential, with the exceptions of an open field across Rhawn Avenue, and a former one-story industrial building at the end of the road, that is fenced off. A Boise Cascade warehouse can be found across from the east end of Rhawn Avenue on Coopertown Road.

References

External links

River Line stations
Railway stations in the United States opened in 2004
2004 establishments in New Jersey
Railway stations in Burlington County, New Jersey